Eucalyptus aenea is a tree native to eastern Australia, known only from Goulburn River National Park in New South Wales. It is regarded as a synonym of E. viridis by the Australian Plant Census.

References

aenea
Myrtales of Australia
Flora of New South Wales
Trees of Australia
Plants described in 1997